The Black Flash is a fictional comic book character from DC Comics. Created by writers Grant Morrison and Mark Millar, and artist Ron Wagner, the character had cameos in The Flash vol. 2 #138 (June 1998), before appearing in full in The Flash vol. 2 #141 (September 1998).

Fictional character background

Original depiction 
The Black Flash essentially fulfills the same role as Death for those who possess super-speed in the DC Universe, returning the speedster to their power source: the Speed Force. It is reportedly seen before the deaths of Barry Allen and Johnny Quick. Max Mercury, having had several near-death experiences, has also seen the Black Flash.

It came for Wally West to draw back to the Speed Force, but instead took Linda Park. Having seen portents of Wally's death, Max Mercury and Jesse Quick intercepted Wally before reaching the museum where Linda was waiting, with Linda thus being struck by the lightning that was meant to kill Wally. It later returns to try to take Wally again, freezing time except for those who possess a connection to the Speed Force. Max Mercury, Jay Garrick, and Jesse Quick all attempt to assist Wally by distracting the Black Flash; Wally finally defeats the Black Flash by racing the creature to the end of time, to a point where Death would have no meaning, causing the creature to dissipate.

The Black Flash appears to Bart Allen when the Flash loses his powers while battling the Rogues at the Getty Center. Despite a clash with Inertia (another possible candidate for the Black Flash), Bart is killed shortly thereafter by the panicked Rogues when it appears Bart would win, even without powers.

Most recently, the Black Flash is revealed to represent the dark aspect of the Speed Force, which is responsible for the empowerment of Wally's children. His connection to death is limited to those connected to the Speed Force. While an issue of Captain Atom suggests Death of the Endless, the Black Racer, and Nekron are all aspects of the same force, Neil Gaiman (creator of Death of the Endless) disagrees with this idea, stating that his creation is the ultimate personification of Death.

During the Final Crisis, Wally theorizes that the Black Racer pursuing himself and Barry is in fact the Black Flash.

A charred corpse, appearing to be the Black Flash, was found in Iowa by two boys in The Flash: Rebirth.

When the Force Barrier was destroyed and the other forces were unleashed, the Black Flash was sent to hunt down the conduits of the unleashed forces. The Black Flash arrives in the Speed Lab within the Flash Museum and attacks Steadfast, the Still Force avatar. After Hunter Zolomon (now as "The Flash") takes Barry into the timestream (called the "Forever Force") built by the Speed Force, the Black Flash continues to chase them in order to kill them (in the hopes of healing the Speed Force). Hunter sacrifices himself to the Force Barrier in order to finally heal the Speed Force and keep the Black Flash from going after Steadfast and Fuerza, as he had already killed Psych. Due to the sacrifice, the Forever Force broken down trapping the Black Flash inside, while Barry escaped.

Barry Allen 

Later when discovering the body, Barry Allen is transformed into the next Black Flash, but the state is reversed. It's revealed that Professor Zoom has altered the Speed Force which results in Barry's Black Flash transformation.

Eobard Thawne 

The broken-necked corpse of Eobard Thawne is reanimated as a member of the Black Lantern Corps. Equipped with a black power ring, Thawne declared himself as the Black Flash, until Thawne's corpse is brought back to life.

Other versions
The Ame-Comi Girls universe version of Black Flash is Jesse Quick.

In other media

Television
An adapted depiction of the Black Flash appears in TV series set in the Arrowverse.
 Introduced in The Flash, this version was originally Hunter Zolomon / Zoom (portrayed by Teddy Sears) transformed in the second season's end by Time Wraiths to serve as the Speed Force's Grim Reaper-esque enforcer by hunting down speedsters who attempt to change the timeline and erase them from existence. In the third season, the Black Flash is sent to erase Savitar before the latter can enact a plan to be a god, only to be destroyed by Killer Frost.
 Throughout the second season of Legends of Tomorrow, the Black Flash pursues a time aberration of Eobard Thawne / Reverse-Flash to erase and correct the current timeline. After the Legion of Doom and locate the Spear of Destiny to change reality and succeed, Thawne traps the Black Flash until Sara Lance undoes this, allowing the Black Flash to erase Thawne from existence before returning to the Speed Force.

Video games
 The Black Flash appears in Justice League Heroes: The Flash. When the player dies, Wally West / Flash is chased by the Black Flash. After each death, escaping the Black Flash gets increasingly difficult.
 The Eobard Thawne incarnation of the Black Flash appears as an alternate skin for Barry Allen / Flash in Injustice: Gods Among Us.
 The Black Flash appears in Scribblenauts Unmasked: A DC Comics Adventure.
 The Black Flash appears in DC Legends.

Miscellaneous
 A demonic Black Flash (also known as the Speed Demon and Black Racer) appears in Smallville Season 11. It seeks out Impulse and Jay Garrick's souls, but comes into conflict with the former and Superman. Due to being the fastest between Bart and Garrick, the Black Flash primarily focuses its attention on Impulse until the latter sacrifices himself to destroy it. This goes on to inspire Garrick to come out of retirement and form the Titans.

References

External links
Profile on Black Flash

Characters created by Grant Morrison
Characters created by Mark Millar
Comics characters introduced in 1998
DC Comics male supervillains
DC Comics characters who can move at superhuman speeds
Fictional characters who can manipulate time
Fictional monsters
Fictional personifications of death
Zombies in comics
Flash (comics) characters